Naomh Éanna GAA is a hurling, Gaelic football and camogie club based in Gorey, County Wexford, Ireland.St.Enda’s

History
The hurling club was founded in 1970 by a group of Christian Brothers and takes its name from Scoil Éanna, the school founded by Patrick Pearse.

The camogie team was revived in 2002.

Naomh Éanna won the Wexford IHC in 2015, advanced to the 2015–16 All-Ireland Intermediate Club Hurling Championship where they lost to Kiltale (Meath). Naomh Éanna were also promoted to the senior championship, winning their first senior hurling county title in 2018.

Honours 
 Wexford Senior Hurling Championship: 1 2018
 Wexford Premier Division U14 Hurling Championship: 2017
 Wexford Premier Division U15 Hurling Championship: 2018
 Wexford Premier Division U14 Football Championship: 2017
 Wexford Premier Division U15 Football Championship: 2018
 Wexford Intermediate Hurling Championship: 4 1974, 1990, 2001, 2015
 Wexford Intermediate A Hurling Championship: 1 2012
 Wexford Premier Division U17 Football Championship 2019
 Wexford Premier Division U17 Hurling Championship 2020

Notable players

Billy Byrne
Ger Cushe
Cathal Dunbar
Rory Kinsella
Conor McDonald
Shane McGuckin (played county hurling for Offaly)

References

External links 

Facebook page

Gaelic games clubs in County Wexford
Gaelic football clubs in County Wexford
Hurling clubs in County Wexford